Erik Andersson (26 December 1921 – 31 July 2002) was a Swedish athlete. He competed in the men's decathlon at the 1948 Summer Olympics.

References

1921 births
2002 deaths
Athletes (track and field) at the 1948 Summer Olympics
Swedish decathletes
Olympic athletes of Sweden
Sportspeople from Mannheim